This is a list of bus rapid transit (BRT) systems which are in operation or under construction.  The term "BRT" has been applied to a wide range of bus services. In 2012, the Institute for Transportation and Development Policy (ITDP) published a BRT Standard to make it easier to standardize and compare bus services.

Africa

Morocco
 Marrakesh : BRT Marrakesh, opened 28 September 2017. Not BRT certified in 2022.

Nigeria
The Lagos Bus Rapid Transit System (Lagos BRT) is Africa's first. The Nigerian government is building a BRT system for the Lagos Metropolitan Area, and the project's first phase has been completed. The first phase, from mile 12 through Ikorodu Road and Funsho Williams Aveğnue to CMS, was commissioned on March 17, 2008. Not BRT certified in 2022.

The Lagos Metropolitan Area Transport Authority (LAMATA) BRT corridor is about 22 kilometres long. Two operators, NURTW Cooperative and the state-owned Lagos BRT, contributed about 180 high-capacity buses to the first phase. It is the world's most economical BRT, costing $1.6 million per km for the 22-km route. The first phase cost N4.5 billion (about US$35 million) and included elevated segregation barriers, road repairs on bus and service lanes, de-silting of blocked drainage channels, and bus stops. Included in this group includes the Oshodi - Abule-Egba BRT Lane and many others. Not BRT certified in 2022.

South Africa
 Cape Town: The city's MyCiTi system began operations in May 2010, just before the World Cup. Its first service was a shuttle from the airport to the central business district. The initial Phase 1A trunk and feeder services began operation in May 2011. The remaining Phase 1A construction was completed in 2014, and phase 1B construction was completed in 2015.  Bronze BRT certified in 2022.
 Johannesburg: The Rea Vaya ("We're moving") line opened its first phase (phase 1A) to the public on 30 August 2009, and BRT expansion is under construction; stations and roadworks are mainly completed or are in the final stages. The system was partially opened for the 2010 World Cup, with the full system linking most of Johannesburg from Soweto in the south to beyond Sandton in the north. Buses include those able to use the BRT stations and general bus stops, to be feeders for the network; others are articulated, and can only use BRT stations. Like most transport projects, the system will be implemented in phases. Phase 1 of the estimated two-billion-rand projects has run articulated right-of-way buses along dedicated median bus lanes in both directions across Johannesburg since 2010, covering almost half the city. The 120-km Phase 1 route includes 150 stations, eight terminals, and six depots. Phase 1A, consisting of a 40-km route with 48 stations, was completed in April 2009 (before the FIFA Confederations Cup); Phase 1B added 86 km and 102 stations to the system before the 2010 World Cup. According to the city's website, the system is fully integrated with other transport networks. Rea Vaya will not compete with other transport systems, such as the South African Rail Commuter Corporation or the Gautrain.
 Nelson Mandela Bay: A BRT system was implemented in the city for the 2010 World Cup. Bus lanes have been built through the city, with buses built by Marcopolo.
 Tshwane: Construction began in July 2012, and the system was to be operational from five in the morning to midnight.
 Rustenburg: The Yarona ("It is ours") BRT system began with Phase 1A trunk and feeder services in 2016.

Tanzania

Dar-es-Salaam began operations for its first BRT corridor on 10 May 2016. Construction of the first phase was completed in December 2015 at a total cost of €134 million funded by the African Development Bank, World Bank and the Government of Tanzania. The first phase of the project has a total length of 21.1 kilometers with dedicated bus lanes on three trunk routes with a total of 29 stations. Not BRT certified in 2022.

Americas

Argentina

Brazil

 

 Curitiba's Rede Integrada de Transporte, the world's first BRT system.  6 Silver + 1 Gold BRT corridors certified in 2013.
 São Paulo: Expresso Tiradentes and  Metropolitano ABD. Basic + Bronze +Silver BRT corridors certified in 2013.
 Rio de Janeiro: Transoeste (the city's first BRT line, which opened in June 2012), Transcarioca (opened in June 2014), Transolimpica (opened in July 2016) and Transbrasil (under construction). 2 Silver  +2 Gold BRT corridors certified in 2013-2016.
 Goiânia: Eixo Anhanguera, a BRT system with segregated bus lanes. Bronze BRT certified in 2014.
 Porto Alegre: Portais da Cidade, under construction and scheduled to open in 2014. Basic + Bronze BRT corridors certified in 2016.
 Belo Horizonte: BRT Move, under construction and scheduled to open in 2012. 1 Silver + 1 Gold BRT corridor certified (2014).
 Manaus. Not BRT certified in 2022.
 Salvador: Under construction, scheduled to open in 2014
 Aracaju
 Campinas: Under construction from 2017 to 2020, it will have two main parallel lines (Campo Grande and Ouro Verde) and a secondary link (Perimetral) totaling 36.6 km.
 Uberlândia:  Estrutural; being expanded, scheduled for completion in 2011-2012. Silver BRT certified in 2014.
 Belém: Estação São Bráz, Estação Entrocamento/Castanheira and Estação Mangueirão are under construction and scheduled to be finished in July 2013
 Uberaba. Silver BRT certified in 2016.
 Criciúma: Av. Centenário
 Fortaleza: Expresso Fortaleza (Corredor Antônio Bezerra-Papicu and Corredor Messejana-Centro)
 Brasília: Eixo Sul (Santa Maria and Gama), the first BRT line, opened in April 2014. Construction of the Eixo EPTG (Taguatinga) BRT line ended in 2013, but it is not in operation due to the lack of an appropriate bus fleet. Bronze BRT certified (2014).

Canada

 Brampton, Ontario: Brampton Transit's Züm has a pay-on-board system, similar to its local Brampton Transit counterpart.
 Calgary, Alberta: Calgary Transit's MAX System and BRT System make up their network of rapid transit along with their light rail.
 Durham Region, Ontario (suburban Toronto): Durham Region Transit's DRT Pulse
 Gatineau, Quebec: Société de transport de l'Outaouais's Rapibus
 Halifax, Nova Scotia: Metro Transit's MetroLink operates three routes linking Portland Hills, Woodside and Sackville and downtown Halifax. Fares are higher than the conventional Metro Transit.
 Kelowna, British Columbia: Kelowna Regional Transit System's RapidBus (part of BC Transit)
 Montreal, Quebec (STM BRT): The SRB (Service rapide par bus) Pie-IX is currently under construction on Pie-IX Boulevard, with dedicated right of way and station-like stops, including indoor transfer to a metro station also under construction. Other lines have preferential traffic signals and dedicated lanes.
 Mississauga, Ontario: MiWay's Mississauga Transitway
 Ottawa: OC Transpo Transitway is one of North America's largest BRT systems, with over 200,000 passengers daily and peak capacities of 10,000 passengers per hour per direction. Most sections of the Transitway have a speed limit of 70–90 km/h (43–56 mph) between stations and 50 km/h (31 mph) in station areas. Many routes converge at the Transitway, providing frequent service.
 Quebec City: Réseau de transport de la Capitale's Métrobus has four BRT routes throughout the city: routes 800, 801, 802, 803, 804 and 807
 Saint John, New Brunswick: Saint John Transit's three ComeX (Community Express) routes link Grand Bay-Westfield, Rothesay, Quispamsis and Hampton to uptown Saint John. The fare is higher than the conventional Saint John Transit.
 Saskatoon: Saskatoon Transit had four DART (Direct Access Rapid Transit) routes which connected downtown Saskatoon, Confederation Mall, The Centre, the University of Saskatchewan, The Mall at Lawson Heights, University Heights Suburban Centre and the Saskatchewan Polytechnical Institute campus. The service was expanded to a greater set of suburban connector routes, but rebranded into STS's regularly scheduled service. (e.g. 81, 82, 83, 84, and 86 serving outgoing routes, and are all consolidated as 8 when returning to the downtown terminal after serving their respective neighbourhoods.)
 Toronto: Toronto Transit Commission (TTC) formerly operated the BRT route, 196 York University Rocket on the York University Busway. Although it has been successful, the TTC planned to close the BRT route once the extension to Line 1 of the Toronto subway was completed. Following completion of the subway extension, the small portion near York University was closed and turned back to the university, whereas the just under 2 km section between Finch West station and Dufferin Street remains in operation. The busway is still used by a handful of routes. Elsewhere, dedicated bus lanes are starting to be installed on city roadways, starting with Eglinton Avenue East, Kingston Road and Morningside Avenue in 2020. Jane Street is being planned through 2021, with three additional corridors (Dufferin, Steeles West and Finch East) to be designed afterwards. A sixth corridor (Lawrence East) is in consideration.
 Vancouver: TransLink's RapidBus started in 2020 as a successor to its B-Lines, with more passenger features and amenities. The 99 B-Line is the last remaining B-Line route and has been successful, but TransLink estimates that its SkyTrain costs about $0.75 per ride compared to $1.04-$2.22 for its BRT routes. Two B-Line routes have been replaced by rapid-transit lines; the 98 B-Line was replaced with the Canada Line in 2009 and the 97 B-Line by the Evergreen Extension in 2016. Another two B-Lines, the 95 and 96, were replaced with RapidBus routes, the R5 and R1 respectively. Along with the two upgraded B-Lines, there are also three other RapidBus routes, R2, the R3 and R4.
 Waterloo Region, Ontario: Grand River Transit's iXpress has two routes, one of which (Route 200) has been converted to the ION light rail.
Winnipeg: Winnipeg Transit's Winnipeg RT operates similarly to Ottawa's, with dedicated lanes outside the downtown core and HOV lanes within it. The first phase connects downtown with Fort Rouge, with current routes servicing the University of Manitoba along Pembina Highway and a few suburban communities in the south-west. It will be eventually extended to Bison Drive.
 York Region, Ontario (suburban Toronto): York Region Transit's Viva began service in 2005. In response to escalating congestion on the region's roads, the region's transit plan included a provision for a BRT system along the Yonge Street and Highway 7 arterial corridors. Most of the system does not contain transit-priority measures, other than an honor system of fare payment. However, construction is underway on dedicated busways, and the first segment opened on March 6, 2011.

Chile
 Santiago: Transantiago
 Concepción: A transit system is integrated between the electric Biotren and BioBus, based on dedicated bus rights-of-way.

Colombia

Bogotá's segregated, four-lane TransMilenio system has a maximum peak-load capacity of 45,000 passengers per direction per hour (ppdph) on its busiest line. The system uses modular median stations which serve both directions and enable prepaid, multiple-door, level boarding. The average stop time is 24 seconds. Trunk-line terminals have integrated bicycle parking; the fare card opens a gate to a secure bicycle-parking area. Two lanes in each direction permit "Quickways" (local service on the inside lane combined with express service, skipping four or five stations at a time). TransMilenio was described as a "model BRT system" in the National Bus Rapid Transit Institute's May 2006 report. It serves Bogotá with high-capacity, articulated, three-door buses. Bi-articulated buses are used on the busiest routes, and a smart card system is used for fare collection. Despite its large capacity, Transmilenio had problems with overcrowding.

Ecuador

 Quito: El Trole is a trolleybus BRT system operated by Compañía Trolebús Quito. Plans exist to convert the northernmost portion of the system to light rail. Ecovía and Metrobus diesel BRT lines have several subsystems: Trolebús (Corredor Trole), Ecovía (Corredor Ecovía), Metrobús (Corredor Central Norte), Corredor Sur Oriental and Corredor Sur Occidental. Trolebús electric trolley buses can also operate on gas. Except for local routes, all buses are articulated.
 Guayaquil: Several Metrovia routes have been built, and one is under construction. Except for local routes, all buses are articulated.

Guatemala

Guatemala City's Transmetro has two lines and 32 stations. The first line opened February 3, 2007, and crosses Avenue Aguilar Batres from Villa Nueva to the city. The second line began operation on August 12, 2010, and crosses 6th and 7th Avenues in a one-way-per-avenue scheme.

Mexico

 Chihuahua, Chihuahua: Vivebús, the city's first BRT line, was inaugurated in August 2013. It has 44 stations on a  route.
 Ciudad Juárez' first BRT line was inaugurated in November 2013, and has 34 stations on a  route.
 Guadalajara, Jalisco: Macrobús, the city's first BRT line, was inaugurated in March 2009 and has 27 stations on a  route.
 León, Guanajuato: Optibús, Mexico's first BRT system, was inaugurated in September 2003 and has 65 stations on a  route.
 Greater Mexico City: Metrobús was opened to the public on June 19, 2005. The first line runs in dedicated lanes along Avenida Insurgentes, and there are seven lines (including one along Paseo de la Reforma). Three Mexibús routes operate in the Mexico City metro area which is part of the State of Mexico. Mexibus it also operates within the metropolitan area
 Monterrey, Nuevo León: Ecovía and Transmetro, the city's first BRT line, was inaugurated in January 2014. It has 41 stations on a  route.
 Pachuca, Hidalgo: Tuzobús
 Puebla, Puebla: RUTA (Red Urbana de Transporte Artículado), the city's first BRT line, was inaugurated in January 2013. It has 36 stations on an  route.
 Tijuana, Baja California: The SITT BRT system operates a route from downtown Tijuana and Garita Puerto Mexico near the San Ysidro Port of Entry, southeast along the Tijuana River to Terminal Insurgentes in the southeastern part of the city.
 Queretaro: Qrobus 
 Pachuca: Tuzobus 
 Acapulco: Acabus 
 Villahermosa: Transbus
 Torreon: Metrobus Laguna (In construction) 
 Oaxaca de Juarez: SITT Oaxaca (In construction)
 San Luis Potosi: (In construction)
 Tampico: Metrobus Tampico (In construction)

Peru
 Lima: El Metropolitano is Peru's first mass transit system implemented in several decades. It runs from the northern district of Independencia to the southern district of Chorrillos, on roads such as Avenida Paseo de la Republica, Av. Alfonso Ugarte and Av. Tupac Amaru.
 Arequipa: Mistibus is under construction.
 Trujillo: under construction

United States

 Albany and Schenectady, New York: Capital District Transportation Authority: BusPlus
 Albuquerque, New Mexico: Albuquerque Rapid Transit (first Gold-Standard BRT line in the United States)
 Austin, Texas: Capital Metro: Capital MetroRapid (some BRT features)
 Birmingham, Alabama: Birmingham-Jefferson County Transit Authority: Birmingham Xpress
 Boston: MBTA: Silver Line, Columbus Avenue Bus Lanes
 Charleston: Lowcountry Rapid Transit (planned, estimated to start in 2026)
 Chicago: Pace (transit): Pace Pulse Milwaukee Line (100)

 Cleveland: Greater Cleveland RTA: HealthLine
 Columbus, Ohio: COTA: CMAX
 El Paso, Texas: Sun Metro: BRIO Line
 Eugene, Oregon: Lane Transit District: Emerald Express
 Fort Collins, Colorado: Transfort: MAX Bus Rapid Transit
 Grand Rapids, Michigan: The Rapid: 
Silver Line
 Laker Line - a bus line connecting Grand Valley State University's two main campuses. Opened August 2020.
 Hartford-New Britain, Connecticut: CTtransit: CTfastrak
 Houston, Texas: Harris County Metro: HOV BRT System and Quickline; Planned to be followed by METRORapid in August 2020.
 Indianapolis: IndyGo: Red Line BRT Planned to be followed by a Purple Line BRT in 2021 and a Blue Line BRT in 2022.
 Jacksonville, Florida: Jacksonville Transportation Authority: First Coast Flyer
 Kansas City, Missouri: Kansas City Area Transportation Authority: Metro Area Express
 Los Angeles: LACMTA: Metro Rapid Orange Line and Silver Line
 San Bernardino, California: San Bernardino Express (operated by Omnitrans): sbX Green Line, a 16-mile route from Verdemont to Loma Linda which opened on April 25, 2014.
 San Gabriel Valley: Foothill Transit: Silver Streak and El Monte Busway
 Santa Monica, California: Big Blue Bus: Route 3
 Miami-Dade: "South Dade BRT Line"
 Minneapolis-St. Paul, Minnesota: Metro: Red Line, Orange Line, A Line and C Line
 Newark, New Jersey: NJ Transit: go bus
 New York City: MTA Regional Bus Operations: Select Bus Service
 Oakland, California: AC Transit: Tempo
 Orlando, Florida: Central Florida Regional Transportation Authority (Lynx): Lymmo
 Philadelphia, Pennsylvania: SEPTA: Route 103
 Phoenix, Arizona: Valley Metro: RA
 Pittsburgh: Port Authority of Allegheny County: Martin Luther King Jr. East Busway, West Busway and South Busway
 Portland: Trimet Division Transit Project, a BRT completed between downtown Portland and downtown Gresham mainly following Southeast Division Street, with service begun Sept 18, 2022.
 Provo - Orem, Utah: Utah Transit Authority (UTA): UVX
 Reno, Nevada: RTC of Washoe County: RAPID
 Richmond, Virginia: Greater Richmond Transit Company (GRTC): Pulse
 Salt Lake City, Utah: Utah Transit Authority (UTA): MAX
 San Antonio, Texas: VIA Metropolitan Transit: Primo Route 100 Fredericksburg Road corridor BRT, connecting downtown with the South Texas Medical Center
 San Diego, California: San Diego MTS: SuperLoop and Rapid
 Escondido, California: North County Transit District: Breeze Rapid
 San Francisco, California: Muni: Van Ness Bus Rapid Transit and Geary Bus Rapid Transit
San Francisco Bay Area, California (Santa Clara Country): Santa Clara Valley Transportation Authority: Route 522, from Eastridge Transit Center in San Jose to Palo Alto
San Francisco Bay Area, California (Alameda County): Livermore-Amador Valley Transportation Authority: Tri-Valley Rapid
 Seattle, Washington: King County Metro: RapidRide
 Seattle metropolitan area (Everett, Washington): Community Transit: Swift
 Spokane, Washington: Spokane Transit Authority: City Line
 Stockton, California: San Joaquin RTD: Metro Express
 Virginia Beach, Virginia: Hampton Roads Transit: VB Wave (some BRT features)
 Washington, DC Metropolitan Area
 Alexandria: WMATA Metroway
 Montgomery County: Ride On Flash

Venezuela
 Mérida: Trolmérida
 Caracas: BusCaracas
 Barquisimeto: Transbarca

Asia

Afghanistan
Kabul: Kabul bus rapid transit (under construction)

Bangladesh
 Dhaka: Dhaka Bus Rapid Transit (under construction)

China

More than 30 projects are being implemented or studied in China's large cities. In the following table, BRT systems in light blue are under construction. Kunming developed the country's first BRT system in 1999.

India
Government-designated BRT systems (BRTS) with segregated lanes:

India is rapidly building new BRTS systems around the country. Several systems are operational while many are under construction and are also proposed.
 White background: Operational 
 Yellow background: Under Construction

Indonesia

TransJakarta is the longest BRT network in the world (251.2 km), carries more than 1 million passengers daily with a fleet of over 3,900 buses. Despite being branded as BRT systems, practically all bus networks in Indonesia except for TransJakarta does not have right of way.

 Bandung metropolitan area: Trans Metro Pasundan
 Banyumas : Trans Banyumas
 Bekasi: Trans Patriot
 Bogor: Trans Pakuan
 Central Java: Trans Jateng 
 Cirebon: Trans Cirebon
 Depok: BRT Depok
 East Java: Trans Jatim 
 Medan: Trans Metro Deli
 Medan metropolitan area: Trans Mebidang
 South Tangerang: Trans Anggrek
 Tangerang: Trans Kota Tangerang
 Palangka Raya: Trans Palangka Raya
 Pontianak: Trans Metro Pontianak
 Jayapura: Trans Jayapura

Iran
 Tehran: Tehran BRT (10 lines)
 Tabriz: Tabriz BRT (2 lines)
 Shiraz: Shiraz BRT (4 lines)
 Isfahan: Isfahan BRT (3 lines)
 Kerman: Kerman BRT (2 lines)
 Mashad: Mashad BRT (5 lines)

Israel
 Haifa: Metronit
 Jerusalem: Four lines (71, 72, 74, 75)
 Ashdod: Ashdod Metro Bus

Japan

 Ibaraki, Japan : Ishioka Station-Hokota Station (Kashitetsu Bus) and Ishioka Station-Ibaraki Airport, Kantetsu Green Bus. Not BRT certified in 2022.
 Kesennuma and Ofunato Lines: Inter-city railway converted to single-lane BRT after the 2011 Tōhoku earthquake and tsunami. Not BRT certified in 2022.
 Nagoya: Yutorito Line. Not BRT certified in 2022.
 Niigata: Bandai-bashi Line. Not BRT certified in 2022.
 Tokyo BRT: to start pre-service by 24 May 2020, and full operations by 2022. Not BRT certified in 2022.

Jordan

 Amman Bus Rapid Transit began operation partially in 2021. Phase one has three routes: Route 98, Route 99, and Route 100. Phase two is expected to begin operation in 2022.
 Amman-Zarqa Bus Rapid Transit currently under construction, with operations set to begin in 2023.

Malaysia

BRT Sunway Line, Malaysia's first BRT system, is 5.4 km long and connects major areas of Bandar Sunway on a dedicated, elevated road. It is Asia's first electric BRT system.
Iskandar Malaysia BRT will be the second BRT system to be develop in Malaysia with 51 km in length consist of 3 trunk routes for Tebrau, Skudai and Iskandar Puteri corridors.

Pakistan

Philippines
 EDSA Busway: Opened in June 2020.
 Clark Loop: Opened in December 2019. (4 lines)
 Cebu Bus Rapid Transit (under construction)

South Korea

 Goyang-Susaek BRT: Opened in April 2010. First BRT in South Korea with bus priority signal system.
 Hanam-Cheonho BRT: Opened in March 2011.
 Sejong: Opened in September 2012.
 Cheongna International City-Gangseo BRT: Opened in July 2013.
 Daejeon-Osong BRT: Opened July 20, 2016, utilizing Sejong dedicated corridor.

Taiwan

Chiayi Bus Rapid Transit has two routes: 7211 (between Chiayi City Centre and Puzi) and 7212, between the Chiayi TRA station and the Chiayi HSR station.

Taichung has a "Optimized Bus Lane" formerly designated as Taichung BRT. It is still using most of the facilities built in BRT era, only the priority bus signals were cancelled.

Taipei also has 8 routes that are considered a BRT system.

Thailand
 
The Bangkok BRT runs 16.5 kilometres from Sathon to Ratchapruek. The route begins at Sathon and runs along Narathiwat Ratchanakharin Road, turns right at Rama III Road, crosses the Chao Phraya River on the Rama III Bridge and follows Ratchadaphisek Road before turning right at Ratchahruek Road. At the Sathon-Narathiwat Ratchanakharin intersection, a walkway connects BRT Sathon and the BTS Chong Nonsi station. The system began operating on 29 May 2010. Bronze BRT certified in 2014.

Turkey
 Istanbul: Metrobus, between Tuyap and Söğütlüçeşme, is Turkey's first full-service bus rapid transit system. It has a fully separated right-of-way (except crossing the Bosphorus Bridge) and off-bus fare collection. Silver BRT certified in 2014.
 Malatya: Trambus is a mixed-traffic BRT system with bi-articulated trolleybuses. Not BRT certified in 2022.

Vietnam

The 14.7-km Hanoi BRT system runs from the downtown Kim Mã terminal to the Yên Nghĩa terminal in Hanoi's southern suburbs. The line opened on 31 December 2016 with a one-month free trial. The system is a component of the Hanoi Urban Transport Development Project, which was approved by the Hanoi People's Committee in Decision 1837/QĐ-UBND on May 10, 2007. The World Bank-funded ODA project is a step in improving the city's urban transport network and increasing public-transport capacity. Not BRT certified in 2022.

Europe

Austria
 Vienna's entire bus system includes many BRT features such as stop distancing, place name signs on all bus stop signs, all door boarding and an entirely proof of payment, off-board fare collection system. Not BRT certified in 2022.

Belgium
 Liège has a busway which was documented in a Transport Research Laboratory video.Not BRT certified in 2022.

Finland
Helsinki, Tampere and Turku have extensive bus-lane networks in their city centers. None is BRT certified in 2022.

France

 Belfort: Optymo II. Not BRT certified in 2022.
 Cannes: BRT of Cannes, Mandelieu-la-Napoule and Le Cannet Line 1. Not BRT certified in 2022.
 Chalon-sur-Saône: BRT Flash. Not BRT certified in 2022.
 Clermont-Ferrand: T2C lines B and C. Not BRT certified in 2022.
 Dijon: BRT Lianes. Not BRT certified in 2022.
 Douai: Évéole. Not BRT certified in 2022.
 Évry: France's first line (1975). Not BRT certified in 2022.
 Île-de-France (Greater Paris): Trans-Val-de-Marne (TVM), line 393 and T Zen 1. Silver BRT certified in 2014.
 La Rochelle: Illico Line. Not BRT certified in 2022.
 Lille: Lianes network of Lille Métropole. Not BRT certified in 2022.
 Lorient: BRT Triskell. Not BRT certified in 2022.
 Lyon: lines C1, C2 and C3. Not BRT certified in 2022.
 Marseille: Five TGB lines . Not BRT certified in 2022.
Martinique: . Not BRT certified in 2022. 
 Maubeuge: BusWay lines of the du Stibus network. Not BRT certified in 2022.
 Metz: BRT Mettis. Not BRT certified in 2022.
 Nantes: Nantes Busway. Bronze BRT certified in 2013.
 Nîmes: Line T1, Tango+. Not BRT certified in 2022.
 Rennes: Chronostar line 4. Not BRT certified in 2022.
 Rouen: Three TEOR lines. Silver BRT certified in 2014.
 Strasbourg: line G (Gare Centrale–Espace Européen de l'Entreprise). Not BRT certified in 2022.
 Saint-Nazaire: Hélyce. Not BRT certified in 2022.
 Sophia-Antipolis: Bus-Tram. Not BRT certified in 2022.
 Toulouse: Toulouse BRT. Not BRT certified in 2022.
 Tours: Line 2 Tempo. Not BRT certified in 2022.

Paris region
 Créteil Tvm, operated by RATP, is a BRT system linking the RER A, B, C, D, Metro line 8 and tramway line T7 in Paris' southern suburbs. It was the second BRT system implemented in France during the 1980s; in Saint-Maur-des-Fossés, for political reasons, there are no bus lanes through the conservative city. It has been BRT certified with Silver Excellence in 2014.
 Créteil 393 also operated by RATP, is an 11-km line which opened in 2011. Like the TVM, the line links the southern Paris suburbs in the département of Val de Marne. Line 393 shares the bus lane and stations with TVM for five kilometres, and serves Metro line 8 and recently developed districts.. Not BRT certified in 2022.
 Corbeil-Essonnes TZen 1 opened in 2011, connecting two branches of the RER D and providing public transport to Sénart's business and commercial parks.. Not BRT certified in 2022.
 Évry has a segregated, elevated system.. Not BRT certified in 2022.

Germany
Essen: Guided buses use a busway in the center of a motorway. Not BRT certified in 2022.

Italy
 Metromare trolleybus rapid transit, between Rimini and Riccione.. Not BRT certified in 2022.

Netherlands
. Not BRT certified in 2022.
 Almere: All city bus lines, Keolis allGo. Not BRT certified in 2022.
 Eindhoven: Bravo. Not BRT certified in 2022.
 Schiphol: R-net lines 300 and 397 . Not BRT certified in 2022.
 Utrecht: Line 28 to the De Uithof university campus and Vleuten. Not BRT certified in 2022.
 Enschede: Agglonet. Not BRT certified in 2022.

Portugal
 Porto: A Bus Rapid Transit System will be built between Boa Vista and Praça do Império. It will be 8 kilometres long and is scheduled to be completed by the last quarter of 2023. It plans to have a fleet of 8 hydrogen powered articulated buses.

Spain
RetBus, Barcelona: Three lines were scheduled for 2011. Not BRT certified in 2022.
 Las Palmas de Gran Canaria: "MetroGuagua" (in process). Not BRT certified in 2022.
 Bus Rapid, Madrid: EMT de Madrid.

Sweden
 Gothenburg:  Four bus lines (16-19) have frequent service. Routes usually share the right-of-way with trams or have a busway.. Not BRT certified in 2022.
 Stockholm:  (Blue buses). Five bus lines (1-4, 6) run frequently and have a higher priority than other buses. The buses are blue; other buses are red. Differences between blue and red buses are very slight however.. Not BRT certified in 2022.
 Malmö:  (main lines) Eight lines (1-8), which run every seven or eight minutes on weekdays.. Not BRT certified in 2022.
 Jönköping:  Three lines (1-3), which usually run about every 10 minutes.. Not BRT certified in 2022.
 Örebro: . Not BRT certified in 2022.
 Linköping: . Not BRT certified in 2022.

United Kingdom

 Belfast: Glider is a bus rapid transit system operating on a 15.2 mile (24.5 km) route. Service G1 serves east–west and service G2 serves Titanic Quarter. It opened in September 2018. Not BRT certified in 2022.
 Bristol: MetroBus is a three-line bus rapid transit network which opened in stages from 2018 to 2019; with a section of guided busway in Ashton Gate and a bus-only exit and bridge on the M32 motorway . Not BRT certified in 2022.
 Bradford:  of guided busway and a further  of un-guided bus lanes on Manchester Road to the city centre 
 Cambridgeshire: A guided busway, opened in 2011, runs north-west from Milton Road to St Ives and south from the station to the Trumpington park and ride. Bronze BRT certified in 2013.
 Crawley: Fastway. Not BRT certified in 2022.
 Hampshire: South East Hampshire Bus Rapit Transit between Gosport and Fareham. A  bus-only road along the former Fareham–Gosport line has been opened from Titchborne Way in Gosport to Redlands Lane in Fareham as phase one of a larger scheme. Operated by First Hampshire & Dorset as Eclipse. Not BRT certified in 2022.
 Leeds: guided busway along York Road (the A64). Not BRT certified in 2022.
 London: East London Transit, a bus rapid transit system consisting of three routes. Not BRT certified in 2022.
 Luton: The Luton to Dunstable Busway, running between Luton Airport and Houghton Regis via Dunstable following the Dunstable branch line, which closed in 1989, running parallel to the A505 (Dunstable Road) and A5065 (Hatters Way). t runs for 6.1 miles, of which 4.8 is guided track with a maximum speed of 50 mph. The £91 million scheme opened on 25 September 2013. Not BRT certified in 2022.
 Manchester: Leigh-Salford-Manchester Bus Rapid Transit, from Leigh and Atherton to Manchester via Tyldesley and Ellenbrook. The 29-stop scheme totals  and uses part of a former railway line to form a  guided busway with a pedestrian and cycle lane and bridleway. It then joins the East Lancashire Road in a dedicated bus lane. Not BRT certified in 2022.
Not BRT certified in 2022.
 Swansea: Swansea FTR Metro – partially segregated, specialised BRT vehicles, on-board payment to customer-care attendant, runs every 15 minutes from 7 am to 7 pm (a conventional bus at other times).. Not BRT certified in 2022.

Norway 

 Rogaland: Bussveien is an under-construction (planned finished phase one: 2026) bus rapid transit system planned to be the longest in Europe (50 km, 80% dedicated right of way). Not BRT certified in 2022.

Oceania

Australia
 Not BRT certified in 2022.
 Adelaide: O-Bahn Busway. Not BRT certified in 2022.
 Brisbane: South-East, Northern and Eastern Busways. Routes are linked through an underground hub in the central business district. Brisbane busways carried over 70 million passengers in 2011. Silver BRT certified in 2022.
 Melbourne: SmartBus system, which has elements of BRT infrastructure but uses relatively-few dedicated bus lanes. Not BRT certified in 2022.
 Sydney: B-Line, Liverpool–Parramatta T-way, Metrobus: North-West T-way and M2 bus corridor . Not BRT certified in 2022.

New Zealand
 Auckland: Northern Busway, Central Connector, Eastern Busway (under construction). Not BRT certified in 2022.

See also
 Bus rapid transit creep
 BRT Standard

Notes

References

External links
 Bus Rapid Transit Planning Guide - Institute for Transportation & Development Policy - (available for download in pdf)
 Bus Rapid Transit Practitioner's Guide - TCRP Report 118 - sponsored by FHWA (available for download in pdf)
 BRT in China & selected worldwide systems

Bus-related lists